Psychosomatics is a peer-reviewed medical journal that focuses on psychosomatic medicine. It was established in 1960, during William S. Kroger's tenure as head of the Academy of Psychosomatic Medicine. It is published by Elsevier on behalf of the Academy of Psychosomatic Medicine.

References

External links
 
 Academy of Psychosomatic Medicine

Psychosomatic medicine journals
Bimonthly journals
English-language journals
Publications established in 1960
Elsevier academic journals

Psychoneuroimmunology here-  https://en.wikipedia.org/wiki/Psychoneuroimmunology